Frankie and the Witch Fingers is an American rock band formed in Bloomington, Indiana in 2013 and based in Los Angeles, California. The band is composed of Dylan Sizemore (vocals and rhythm guitar) and Josh Menashe (vocals, lead guitar, synthesizer) both are founding members, as well as Nikki Pickle (bass) as of 2020, and Nick Aguilar (drums) as of 2022. They are currently signed to Greenway Records from Brooklyn

History

Bloomington Years and Formation (2013-2018) 
The band was started by Sizemore who initially formed the project as a solo outlet to perform in basement shows, singing, playing the electric guitar, and a kick drum. In the Bloomington basement show scene he met founding members, Glenn Brigman and Josh Menashe. Brigman invited Sizemore to record at the home recording studio that he shared with Menashe, where they recorded their band Triptides. Sizemore would later go on to play bass for Triptides on and off.

Sidewalk (2013) 
During the first recording, Brigman offered to play drums on the tracks and quickly recruited two of the other founding members of the band including Menashe, and Josh Morrow (second drummer) to join the recording effort. This album would become the first Frankie and the Witch Fingers release on a cassette titled, Sidewalk (2013) released by Nice Legs Records.

Sidewalk was recorded to a Tascam 488 by Brigman.  Sidewalk primarily blended garage rock, and surf music. 

Alex Bulli (bass), who played in Prince Moondog with Menashe and Brigman was recruited to fill out the 5-piece lineup for live shows. The band played a handful of live shows together as a 5-piece, until Morrow exited the band later that year, which then performed and recorded as a 4-piece group from 2013 to 2018 producing four full-length albums and two 7-inch records together.

4 Way Split / Self Titled (2014-2015) 
The band’s second release was a song included on a 4 way split 7-inch with Triptides, The See See, and The Young Sinclairs featuring the unreleased track “Revival” in 2014 on Stroll On Records. Permanent Records (Chicago and Los Angeles) heard the track Revival from the split and contacted the band about a partnership to release their newest recordings. Permanent released the band’s subsequent album Frankie and the Witch Fingers - Self-Titled LP (2015), the band’s first release on vinyl.

Moving to Los Angeles / Merry Go Round 7’’/ Heavy Roller 
Brigman, Menashe, and Bulli moved to Los Angeles in 2014. Sizemore flew out to Los Angeles for the band’s first tour in March 2015. Sizemore moved to Los Angeles later that year. After arriving in Los Angeles they met Stu Pope at a show at Permanent Records shop in Highland Park, On (April 1, 2016) they released the first single from their next album that included tracks “Merry-Go-Round” and “Mystical Rapture” on the Merry-Go-Round 7” through Hypnotic Bridge Records (Sierra Madre, CA) as the first release for Stu Pope’s new label. Permanent Records then released the full-length Heavy Roller LP (July 29, 2016).

Heavy Roller saw the band venture into new territory with songs that ranged from psych pop to stretched out acid rock jams.

Brain Telephone (2017) 
After the release of Heavy Roller, the band set about recording a new album in Los Angeles, CA, in the recording studio that they shared with Levitation Room, on a 388 tape machine borrowed from a friend. There they recorded Brain Telephone released on September 15th by Permanent Records. 

Brain Telephone saw the band expand on their psychedelic sound by blending rhythm and blues style rock n’ roll and emphasizing some of their southern rock influences into the mix.

Drip Tea (2018) 
In 2018 they met the band Twin Temple and went into their home studio to record their next release with Twin Temple’s Zachary James, a 7” featuring tracks Drip” and “Tea” released on May 18th by Let’s Pretend Records (Bloomington, Indiana)

 Shaughnessy Starr joins the band / Pleasure 7” / ZAM / (2018-2019) 
In July 2018 following a long stint of tours, Brigman exited to focus his efforts on his band Triptides, and drummer Shaugnessy Starr (ex. Psychic Ju-Jitsu, Hooveriii, Triptides) joined the group in his place.

Shaughnessy Starr immediately began working with the band to write their next record. In September 2018 they toured the US with Stonefield (AUS) on this tour their set consisted almost entirely of unreleased material that would be recorded for ZAM.

ZAM was recorded at Zachary James’ home studio called Studio 666 and Engineered by James and Kevin Mills in September 2018. This was the first full length album completely recorded by a non band member. For ZAM, the band adopted a more rhythmically driven sound and drew on new influences of Krautrock, Jazz, and Funk. 

With Starr they would go on to record ZAM'' LP (2019) a double-album, first releasing the single Pleasure on 7” (2019) featuring “Pleasure” and “Realization (acoustic demo)”, as well as Cavehead (2020) featuring “Cavehead” and “Mind’s Eye” the single from Monsters Eating People Eating Monsters… LP (2020) a concept album in which the songs on each side of the album transition from one to another without any pauses in-between tracks. 

At the end of 2019, Alex Bulli exited the band and bassist Nikki Pickle (ex. Death Valley Girls) joined the group playing one show with the band in Chicago before the shut-down of the COVID-19 pandemic. During the height of the lockdown phase of 2020, the group was able to meet up and record a few live sessions, one of which was streamed live, and released on video and vinyl through Levitation (Reverberation Appreciation Society) and Greenway Records - Levitation Sessions: Frankie and the Witch Fingers LP (2020). The band released a 7-inch on Greenway Records in 2021 called Cookin’ (2021) featuring the tracks “Cookin’” and “Tracksuit”.

Starr exited the band near the middle of 2021 and a replacement drummer Jon Modaff filled-in for their first post-pandemic tour until Starr was replaced by Nick Aguilar (Slaughterhouse, Mike Watt, etc.) as the new current full-time drummer. The new lineup played their first show together on April 30th, 2022 and recorded a full-length album set for release in 2023.

Artwork 

Much of the artwork for the band including early show posters and record cover designs is illustrated by the singer, Dylan Sizemore. Nikki Pickle has also contributed art and graphic design to many of the album reissues, as well as printing merchandise for the band via her business Church of Pickle.

Notable performances 

They performed as an opening act for ZZ Top and Cheap Trick on a handful of their 2019 US Tour dates.
They also have opened for Osees at the Bataclan Theatre in Paris, Ty Segall at Troxy Theater in London, and Porno for Pyros in June 2022.

Discography

Full-length LPs 
Sidewalk (2013) Cassette - Nice Legs Records, LP - Permanent Records (2017), Remastered LP - Greenway Records (2020)
Self-Titled LP (2015) Permanent Records, Remastered LP - Greenway Records (2022)
Heavy Roller LP (2016) Permanent Records, Remastered LP - Greenway Records (2021)
Brain Telephone LP (2017) Permanent Records, Remastered LP - Greenway Records (2021)
ZAM LP (2019) Greenway Records
Monsters Eating People Eating Monsters… LP (2020) Greenway Records

7-inch records 
4-Way Split (2014) 7-Inch Stroll On Records
Merry-Go-Round (2016) Hypnotic Bridge Records
Drip/Tea 7-Inch (2018) Let’s Pretend Records
Pleasure (2019) Greenway Records
Cookin’ (2021) Greenway Records
Electricide/Chalice (2022) Greenway Records / The Reverberation Appreciation Society

References 

Rock music groups